Rafa Casette  (born August 20, 1965) is a Spanish actor and singer. His career began aged 30 in a Spanish zarzuela called La Verbena de la Paloma in 1995. After his participation in Sweeney Todd: The Demon Barber of Fleet Street by Stephen Sondheim in 2009 at the Teatro Español de Madrid, he has been involved continuously in audiovisual projects, including his first lead role in the upcoming film La mujer que hablaba con los muertos (The woman who talked to the dead) by director César del Álamo.

Career
Casette began singing at a young age. After finishing high school he decided to become a lawyer and started his studies at Autonomous University of Madrid, while singing as a hobby in several amateur choirs of progressive quality, performing in international tours (France, Italy, Germany, Czechoslovakia, Switzerland, Poland). He abandoned his law studies due to financial difficulties and over the years he worked as a burger cook, insurance salesman, Internet webmaster, telemarketer, electronic music composer, CGI designer, and comics illustrator.

He made his acting debut in 1995 in the Spanish zarzuela called La Verbena de la Paloma (The Fair of the Dove), filling in for a choir member at the Teatro Calderón de Madrid company of director José Luis Moreno. He first appeared as a chorus singer and support actor, with roles of increasing importance owing to the support of director José Tamayo and his acclaimed international show Antología de la Zarzuela and other zarzuela Spanish directors. In the following years he studied Music and Acting at several public and private schools.

In 2008, he was selected from a cast of 1,200 to play Sweeney Todd: The Demon Barber of Fleet Street, the musical thriller by Stephen Sondheim in 2009 at Teatro Español de Madrid. Taking advantage of free time between rehearsals and plays, he shot his first homemade videobook and enrolled in several talent agencies, starting a continuous audiovisual career; it includes a wide variety of short movies, TV series, international TV commercials, radio broadcast acting and host, and his first lead role in the upcoming film La mujer que hablaba con los muertos (The woman who talked to the dead) by director César del Álamo, which will be released in May 2014 at Nocturna, Madrid International Fantastic Film Festival.

Nominations
Premios Max (2013) — Best Supporting Actor for Pocahontas, El Musical

Filmography

Television

Theatre

Zarzuela being his main activity, Casette has worked throughout Spain over the past eighteen years with many lyric companies including the Teatro de la Zarzuela National Company and the Royal Theatre National Company and he has been involved in the main theater seasons on the Iberian Peninsula. He has a repertoire of over fifty zarzuelas, opera and operetta. He has also participated in the following plays:

References

External links

 Rafa Casette Youtube Channel
 Podcast Casette – iVoox Channel

1965 births
Male actors from Madrid
Spanish male film actors
Spanish male musical theatre actors
20th-century Spanish male actors
21st-century Spanish male actors
Spanish male voice actors
Autonomous University of Madrid alumni
Living people